Mihaela Buzărnescu was the defending champion, but chose not to participate.

Tamara Korpatsch won the title, defeating Timea Bacsinszky in the final, 6–2, 7–5.

Seeds

Draw

Finals

Top half

Bottom half

References
Main Draw

Engie Open de Biarritz - Singles